Udhampur Jammu highway is the national highway and the road in Jammu and Kashmir that connects municipal committee of Udhampur with Jammu City. The highway also provides road link which connects Katra with rest of India. The highway is the small part of Srinagar Jammu National Highway.

Reconstruction
The highway is in the process of major reconstruction. The task is being carried out by National Highway Authority of India funded by Government of India. The whole highway is being rebuilt as four lane road with better bitumen pavement, new traffic sign boards, footpaths, tax toll offices, traffic signals, introduction of new tunnels with minimum number of road curves which would not only provide comfort to the passengers but would also reduce distance between Udhampur and Jammu to certain extent. The state government has estimated that reconstruction of the highway can cost about  2400 crores. Traffic on the highway is controlled by traffic control room Jammu. The railway line connecting Udhampur and Katra with Jammu has eased traffic on the highway as many people prefer to travel in train which is economical and time saving.

The widening work was completed as of 20 June, 2017.

Features
The highway is connected to the bypass road which connects Udhampur with Samba directly bye passing the Jammu City. Moreover, the highway runs through Nandni Wild Life Sanctuary at notified area of Nandni where two new tunnels are being constructed for vehicular purposes. Livestock for hundreds of thousands army personal residing in Udhampur and other parts like Ramban, Kashmir Valley and Ladakh are taken from this highway. Many army headquarters, army schools can be seen while driving on the highway. Some memorable parks are also constructed along the side of highway in the memory of soldiers  martyred in indo-pak wars. The highway provides glances of Shri Mata Vaishno Devi University along the way near Katra road link. The deep gorge separates university from highway but it can be clearly seen from highway.

See also
 Foreshore Road
 90 Feet Road

References

National Highways in Jammu and Kashmir
Transport in Jammu
Transport in Udhampur